Vinnes is a village in Austevoll municipality in Vestland county, Norway. Vinnes School is located in the village, serving the southern part of the island.

References

Villages in Vestland
Austevoll